Christen Christensen may refer to:

 Christen Christensen (figure skater) (1904–1969), Norwegian figure skater
 Christen Christensen (politician) (1826–1900), Norwegian military officer and politician
 Christen Christensen (sculptor) (1806–1845) Danish sculptor and medal-maker
 Christen Christensen (shipowner) (1845–1923), Norwegian ship owner

See also
 Christian Christensen (disambiguation)
 Chris Christensen, Norwegian swimmer
 Chris Christenson, Norwegian-American figure skater